KSPS may refer to:

 KSPS-TV, a public television station (channel 7) licensed to Spokane, Washington, United States
 Wichita Falls Municipal Airport (ICAO code KSPS)
 Sheppard Air Force Base (ICAO code KSPS)
 Kelly Slater's Pro Surfer video game (abbreviated KSPS)